The Glenshane Pass is a major mountain pass cutting through the Sperrin Mountains in County Londonderry, Northern Ireland. It is in the townland of Glenshane Pass on the main Derry to Belfast route, the A6.

A large wildfire broke out in Glenshane Pass in late June 2018, burning more than 600 acres of dry gorse in the pass by 27 June.

Features
It is a Special Area of Conservation. Carn/Glenshane Pass is a large area of intact blanket bog, characterised by undulating topography and including a large, well-developed hummock and pool system within a thick mantle of blanket peat. It is also classed as an Area of Special Scientific Interest.

History
The Glenshane Pass derives its name from the townland of Glenshane. It is erroneously claimed as being named after Shane Crossagh O'Mullan a notorious rapparee, or highwayman, who roamed the highways of County Londonderry and County Tyrone in the late seventeenth and early eighteenth century. However earlier forms of the name exist as far back as the 14th-century long before O'Mullan or rapparrees existed.

The Troubles
On 24 June 1972, three British Army soldiers were killed by a landmine explosion on the Glenshane Pass. Their Land Rover was destroyed by two IEDs consisting of 120 lbs of explosive packed in milk churns.
On 17 March 1978, a British Army soldier was shot dead in a gun battle with IRA gunmen near the Glenshane Pass. Some reports said he was involved in a covert observation post when he spotted two suspected gunmen. He stood up to challenge the men and was fatally wounded, but he shot back wounding one man.

References

Landforms of County Londonderry
Roads in Northern Ireland
Special Areas of Conservation in Northern Ireland